Our Version of Events Tour was a debut global concert tour by Scottish singer Emeli Sandé, in support of her 2012 debut album, Our Version of Events. The tour ran for over two years from 2011 till 2013, covering five continents in the process.

The tour

In 2011, Sandé played a small series of intimate shows in the United Kingdom in November 2011, before supporting British rock-alternative band Coldplay on their Europe leg of their Mylo Xyloto Tour in December 2011, including gigs in Glasgow, Manchester, London, Paris, Amsterdam, Hamburg, Berlin and Cologne.

From January 2012 till April 2012, she performed acoustic intimate shows in North America, including gigs in New York City, San Francisco, Los Angeles and Chicago. Sandé also performed a leg of dates in Europe. In May 2012, she performed several dates at the Official Celebrations Concerts for 2012 Summer London Olympic Torch Relay celebrations. She performed in Cardiff at Coopers Field, Glasgow in June then Inverness, Aberdeen, Dundee and Edinburgh. She then performed at Radio 1's Big Weekend at Hackney Marshes, and the Lovebox Festival.

In July 2012, Sandé performed at her first major festival at Scotland's T in the Park in Kinross and other festivals around Europe. She also performed Abide with me at the opening ceremony of the 2012 London Summer Olympics. She then returned to North America to support Coldplay again, in Toronto, Boston, Detroit and East Rutherford along with Welsh singer-songwriter and musician Marina and the Diamonds. In August and September 2012, Sandé performed at the closing ceremony of the Olympics, V Festival, BBC Radio 2: Live at Hyde Park, Bestival, iTunes Festival and Belsonic Festival in Belfast.

From November 2012 to December 2012, Sandé performed special long shows in Dublin, Glasgow, Birmingham, Manchester, and at London's Royal Albert Hall on 11 November 2012. This concert was filmed and released as DVD in February 2013. Sandé performed two shows in Canada in November 2012, as well as performing at Hammersmith Apollo in London in December 2012 as part of the Crisis Homeless Fundraising Christmas Concert with Paul Weller, Miles Kane and Ben Elton.

In 2013, Emeli Sandé performed a massive leg of dates in North America between January and February 2013, before returning to Europe and United Kingdom, between March and April 2013. She finished European campaign in her hometown Aberdeen, performing two intimate shows at Music Hall Aberdeen on 19 April 2013. She performed two small North America legs in July and August 2013. In August 2013 Sandé, performed at the Made in America festival.

In September 2013, Sandé performed at London's O2 Arena to perform tribute to Stephen Lawrence, along with Ed Sheeran, Rudimental, Plan B, Jessie J, Labrinth, Jamie Cullum, Soul II Soul, Rizzle Kicks, Tinie Tempah, Rita Ora and Beverley Knight. In October 2013, Sandé returned to North America for final leg of the tour.

Main setlists

Other setlists

Opening acts
Seye (April 2012, United Kingdom)
Daley (April 2012, selected dates)
Josh Osho (April 2012, selected dates)
Jess Mills (April, selected dates)
Jess Mills (April, selected dates)
Lisa McLaughlin (15 August 2012)
Foy Vance (16 August 2012)
Duke Special (16 August 2012)
Gabrielle Aplin (5 September 2012)
Bastille (5 September 2012)
Emily King (UK: November 2012) (US: January/February 2013)
Paul Weller (Co-Headling: 19 December 2012)
Miles Kane (Co-Headling: 19 December 2012)
Ben Elton (Co-Headling: 19 December 2012)
Skylar Grey (Los Angeles: 11 February 2013)
Charlene Soraia (Europe: March/April 2013, selected dates)
Lulu James (Europe: March/April 2013, selected dates) (London: Hammersmith Apollo "Night 3", April 2013)
Jacob Banks (United Kingdom: Birmingham, Brighton, Bristol and London "Night 1", March/April 2013)
Sam Smith (United Kingdom: Newcastle, Edinburgh, Manchester and London "Night 2", March/April 2013)
Mahalia (London: Hammersmith Apollo dates and Aberdeen: Music Hall Shows, April 2013)
Rudimental (Las Vegas: House of Blues, New York: Rumsey Playfield, Central Park and Boston: House of Blues. August 2013)
Evan Taylor (Orlando, Florida: House of Blues, July 2013)
Heston (Atlanta, Georgia: The Tabernacle, July 2013)
JOHNNYSWIM (North America – October 2013 leg)
Ivy Levan (North America – October 2013 leg)

Tour dates
{| class="wikitable" style="text-align:center;"
! style="width:200px;"| Date
! style="width:150px;"| City
! style="width:150px;"| Country
! style="width:250px;"| Venue
|-
!colspan="4" | Europe
|-
| 16 September 2010
| Inverness
| rowspan="8"|Scotland
| Madhatters
|-
| 18 September 2010
| Thurso
| Skinandis
|-
| 22 September 2010
| Glasgow
| King Tut's Wah Wah Hut
|-
| 23 September 2010
| rowspan="2"|Edinburgh
| rowspan="2"|Electric Circus
|-
| 14 November 2010
|-
| 15 November 2010
| rowspan="2"|Glasgow
| King Tut's Wah Wah Hut
|-
| 1 November 2011
| Òran Mór
|-
| 2 November 2011
| Edinburgh
| The Caves
|-
| 3 November 2011
| Manchester
| rowspan="6"|England
| Deaf Institute
|-
| 5 November 2011
| Bristol
| The Fleece
|-
| 6 November 2011
| Brighton
| Ballroom
|-
| 7 November 2011
| rowspan="3"|London
| Tabernacle 
|-
| 24 November 2011
| St John's, Smith Square
|-
| 29 November 2011
| KOKO
|-
| 3 December 2011 A
| Glasgow
| Scotland
| Scottish Exhibition and Conference Centre
|-
| 4 December 2011 B
| rowspan="3"|London
| rowspan="3"|England
| rowspan="3"|The O2 Arena
|-
| 9 December 2011 C
|-
| 10 December 2011 C
|-
| 13 December 2011
| Dublin
| Ireland
| The Sugar Club
|-
| 14 December 2011 C
| Paris
| France
| Palais Omnisports de Paris-Bercy
|-
| 15 December 2011 C
| Cologne
| Germany
| Lanxess Arena
|-
| 17 December 2011 C
| Rotterdam
| Netherlands
| Rotterdam Ahoy
|-
| 18 December 2011 C
| Antwerp 
| Belgium
| Sportpaleis
|-
| 20 December 2011 C
| Frankfurt
| rowspan="2"|Germany
| Festhalle Frankfurt
|-
| 21 December 2011 C
| Berlin
| The O2 World
|-
| 11 January 2012 D
| Groningen
| Netherlands
| Eurosonic Noorderslag
|-
| 9 February 2012
| London
| England
| KoKo
|-
!colspan="4" | United States (Acoustic Sets: Leg 1)
|-
| 2 March 2012
| San Francisco
| rowspan="2"|United States
| Café du Nord, Swedish-American Hall
|-
| 5 March 2012
| Minneapolis
| Dakota Jazz Club And Restaurant
|-
!colspan="4" | Europe
|-
| 7 March 2012
| London
| England
| Royal Festival Hall
|-
| 9 March 2012
| London
| England
| Royal Festival Hall (shortened set for 'Equals Live 2012', with Annie Lennox, Katy B and Jess Mills)
|-
| 26 March 2012
| Paris
| France
| Alhambra
|-
| 28 March 2012
| Berlin
| rowspan="2"|Germany
| Festsaal Kreuzberg
|-
| 29 March 2012
| Cologne
| Gloria-Theater
|-
| 31 March 2012
| Amsterdam
| Netherlands
| Paradiso
|-
| 2 April 2012
| Brussels
| Belgium
| Cirque Royal
|-
| 4 April 2012
| Norwich
| rowspan="9"|United Kingdom
| Norwich U.E.A
|-
| 5 April 2012
| Leeds
| O2 Academy Leeds
|-
| 6 April 2012
| Aberdeen
| Music Hall Aberdeen
|-
| 9 April 2012
| Liverpool
| O2 Academy Liverpool
|-
| 10 April 2012 
| Glasgow
| Old Fruitmarket
|-
| 12 April 2012
| Manchester
| The Ritz
|-
| 13 April 2012 
| Cardiff
| Cardiff University Students' Union
|-
| 14 April 2012
| Digbeth
| HMV Institute
|-
| 16 April 2012
| London
| O2 Shepherd's Bush Empire
|-
!colspan="4" | United States (Acoustic Sets: Leg 2)
|-
| 18 April 2012
| Los Angeles
| rowspan="2"|United States
| Bootleg Theater
|-
| 24 April 2012
| New York City
| Music Hall of Williamsburg
|-
!colspan="4" | Wales
|-
| 25 May 2012 E
| Cardiff
| Wales
| Coopers Field
|-
!colspan="4" | United States (Acoustic Sets: Leg 3)
|- 
| 30 May 2012
| Los Angeles
| rowspan="3"|United States
| El Rey Theatre
|-
| 1 June 2012
| Chicago
| Lincoln Hall
|-
| 4 June 2012
| New York City
| Bowery Ballroom
|-
!colspan="4" | Europe
|-
| 8 June 2012 E
| Glasgow
| rowspan="5"|Scotland
| George Square
|-
| 9 June 2012 E
| Inverness
| Northern Meeting Park
|-
| 11 June 2012 E
| Aberdeen
| Castlegate 
|-
| 12 June 2012 E
| Dundee
| Baxter's Park
|-
| 13 June 2012 E
| Edinburgh
| Edinburgh Castle, Esplanade
|-
| 15 June 2012 F
| rowspan="2"|London
| rowspan="3"|England
| Victoria Park
|-
| 23 June 2012 G
| Hackney Marshes
|-
| 6 July 2012 H
| Lower Hardres
| Lounge On The Farm
|-
| 8 July 2012 I
| Kinross
| Scotland
| T in the Park
|-
| 9 July 2012 J
| Rome 
| rowspan="2"|Italy
| Luglio Suona Bene Festival
|-
| 10 July 2012 K
| Tortona 
| Arena Derthona Music Festival
|-
| 14 July 2012 L
| rowspan="2"|Montreux
| rowspan="2"|Switzerland
| Montreux Jazz Festival
|-
| 14 July 2012
| Miles Davis Hall
|-
!colspan="4" | Canada (Supporting Coldplay)
|-
| 23 July 2012M
| rowspan="2"|Toronto
| rowspan="2"|Canada
| rowspan="2"|Air Canada Centre
|-
| 24 July 2012 M
|-
!colspan="4" | England (Opening Ceremony of 2012 Summer Olympics)
|-
| 27 July 2012 N
| London
| England
| Olympic Stadium
|-
!colspan="4" | United States (Supporting Coldplay)
|-
| 29 July 2012 O
| rowspan="2"|Boston
| rowspan="5"|United States
| rowspan="2"|TD Garden
|-
| 30 July 2012 O
|-
| 1 August 2012 O
| Auburn Hills
| The Palace of Auburn Hills
|-
| 3 August 2012 O
| rowspan="2"|East Rutherford
| rowspan="2"|Izod Center
|-
| 4 August 2012 O
|-
!colspan="4" | Europe
|-
| 12 August 2012 P
| London
| England
| Olympic Stadium
|-
| 15 August 2012
| Dublin
| Ireland
| Olympia Theatre
|-
| 16 August 2012 Q
| Belfast
| rowspan="5"|United Kingdom
| Belsonic
|-
| 18 August 2012 R
| Weston-under-Lizard
| Weston Park
|-
| 19 August 2012 R
| Chelmsford
| Hylands Park
|-
| 5 September 2012 S
| London
| Roundhouse 
|-
| 7 September 2012 T
| Isle of Wight
| Bestival
|-
| 13 September 2012 U
| Kotor
| Montenegro
| Maximus
|-
| 5 November 2012
| Dublin 
| Ireland
| Olympia Theatre
|-
| 6 November 2012
| Glasgow
| rowspan="4"|United Kingdom
| Clyde Auditorium
|-
| 8 November 2012
| Birmingham
| Symphony Hall
|-
| 11 December 2012 V
| London
| Royal Albert Hall
|-
| 12 November 2012
| Manchester
| Bridgewater Hall
|-
!colspan="4" | Canada
|-
| 23 November 2012
| Toronto
| rowspan="2"|Canada
| The Opera House
|-
| 24 November 2012
| Montreal
| Métropolis
|-
!colspan="4" | England
|-
| 19 December 2012 W
| London
| England
| Hammersmith Apollo
|-
!colspan="4" | United States
|-
| 12 January 2013
| Atlanta
| rowspan="12"|United States
| Variety Playhouse
|-
| 14 January 2013
| Washington, D.C.
| Howard Theatre
|-
| 15 January 2013
| Boston
| Paradise Rock Club
|-
| 17 January 2013
| New York City
| Webster Hall
|-
| 19 January 2013
| Philadelphia
| The TLA 
|-
| 21 January 2013
| Pontiac
| Pike room @The Crofoot
|-
| 23 January 2013
| Minneapolis
| Varsity Theater
|-
| 1 February 2013
| Seattle
| The Crocodile
|-
| 2 February 2013
| Portland
| Doug Fir Lounge
|-
| 4 February 2013
| San Francisco
| The Independent
|-
| 6 February 2013
| Los Angeles
| El Rey Theatre
|-
| 11 February 2013 X
| West Hollywood
| The Key Club
|- 
!colspan="4" | Europe
|-
| 28 February 2013 Y
| London
| England
| BBC Radio Theatre
|-
| 4 March 2013
| Paris
| France
| Casino de Paris
|-
| 5 March 2013
| Brussels
| Belgium
| Ancienne Belgique
|-
| 6 March 2013 Z
| London
| England
| Wembley Arena
|-
| 8 March 2013
| Lille
| rowspan="2"|France
| Aeronef
|-
| 9 March 2013
| Lyon
| Transbordeur
|-
| 11 March 2013
| Hamburg
| Germany
| Grose Freiheit
|-
| 12 March 2013
| Copenhagen
| Denmark
| Vega
|-
| 13 March 2013
| Berlin
| Germany
| Huxleys
|-
| 15 March 2013
| Zürich
| Switzerland
| Maag
|-
| 16 March 2013
| Turin
| Italy
| Teatro Colosseo
|-
| 17 March 2013
| Munich
| rowspan="2"|Germany
| Tontalle
|-
| 19 March 2013
| Offenbach am Main
| Stadthalle Offenbach
|-
| 20 March 2013
| Luxembourg
| Luxembourg
| Rockhal
|-
| 22 March 2013
| Cologne
| Germany
| E-Werk
|-
| 23 March 2013
| rowspan="2"|Amsterdam
| rowspan="2"|Netherlands
| rowspan="2"|Paradiso
|-
| 24 March 2013
|-
| 26 March 2013
| rowspan="2"|Birmingham
| rowspan="12"|United Kingdom
| rowspan="2"|O2 Academy Birmingham
|-
| 27 March 2013
|-
| 29 March 2013
| rowspan="2"|Newcastle
| rowspan="2"|Newcastle City Hall
|-
| 30 March 2013
|-
| 1 April 2013
| Edinburgh
| Usher Hall
|-
| 2 April 2013
| rowspan="2"|Manchester
| rowspan="2"|O2 Apollo Manchester
|-
| 3 April 2013
|-
| 5 April 2013
| Brighton
| Brighton Dome
|-
| 6 April 2013
| Bristol
| Colston Hall
|-
| 8 April 2013
| rowspan="3"|London
| rowspan="3"|Hammersmith Apollo
|-
| 9 April 2013
|-
| 10 April 2013
|-
| 16 April 2013
| Brussels
| Belgium
| Ancienne Belgique
|-
| 19 April 2013
| rowspan="2"|Aberdeen
| rowspan="2"|Scotland
| rowspan="2"|Music Hall
|-
| 19 April 2013
|-
| 22 April 2013 AA
| London
| England
| St James's Theatre
|-
!colspan="4" | California, United States
|-
| 26 April 2013
| New York City
| rowspan="2"|United States
| Terminal 5
|-
| 10 May 2013 <small>''BB</small>
| Chula Vista
| Sleep Train Amphitheatre
|-
!colspan="4" | Isle of Wight, England|-
| 14 June 2013 CC
| Isle of Wight
| England
|Isle of Wight Festival
|-
!colspan="4" | United States|-
| 2 July 2013
| Orlando
| rowspan="5"|United States
| House of Blues
|-
| 3 July 2013
| Atlanta
| The Tabernacle
|-
| 5 July 2013
| New Orleans
| Essence Festival 2013 @ Mercedes-Benz Superdome
|-
| 8 July 2013
| Houston
| House of Blues
|-
| 9 July 2013
| Dallas
| House of Blues
|-
!colspan="4" | United Kingdom – Summer Festivals|-
| 12 July 2013 DD
| Kinross
| Scotland
| T in the Park 2013
|-
| 13 July 2012 EE
| London
| England
| Wireless Festival
|-
!colspan="4" | United States|-
| 1 August 2013
| Minneapolis
| rowspan="4"|United States
| Pantages Theatre
|-
| 2 August 2013 FF
| Chicago
| Grant Park
|-
| 9 August 2013
| Las Vegas
| House of Blues
|-
| 11 August 2013 GG
| San Francisco
| Outside Lands Music and Arts Festival
|-
!colspan="4" | V Festival, England|-
| 18 August 2013 HH
| Chelmsford
| rowspan="2"|England
| Hylands Park
|-
| 19 August 2013 HH
| Weston-under-Lizard
| Weston Park
|-
!colspan="4" | United States|-
| 28 August 2013
| New York City
| rowspan="4"|United States
| Rumsey Playfield, Central Park
|-
| 30 August 2013
| Boston
| House of Blues
|-
| 31 August 2013 II
| rowspan="2"| Philadelphia
| rowspan="2"|Made in America Festival 2013
|-
| 1 September 2013 II
|-
!colspan="4" | London – United Kingdom JJ
|-
| 29 September 2013
| London
| England
| O2 Arena
|-
!colspan="4" | United States|-
| 11 October 2013
| Miami
| rowspan ="5"|United States
| The Fillmore Miami Beach
|-
| 19 October 2013
| Baltimore
| Joseph Meyerhoff Symphony Hall
|-
| 21 October 2013
| Columbus
| Newport Music Hall
|-
| 23 October 2013
| Nashville
| Ryman Auditorium
|-
| 26 October 2013
| Chicago
| The Vic Theatre
|-
!colspan="4" | London – United Kingdom KK
|-
| 4 November 2013
| London
| England
| KoKo
|-
!colspan="4" | Middle East LL
|-
| 31 December 2013
| Dubai
| United Arab Emirates
| New Year Eve Celebrations 2013/14
|-
|}
Special Events, Festivals, TV Appearances etc.

''A</small> – Emeli supported Coldplay on their Mylo Xyloto Tour in Glasgow, Scotland.
B – Emeli performed at Capital FM's Jingle Bell Ball.
<small>''C – Emeli supported Coldplay on their Mylo Xyloto Tour on their Europe Leg in December 2011.
D – Emeli performed at Eurosonic Noorderslag Festival, 2012 in the Netherlands.
E – Emeli performed at 2012 Summer Olympics torch relay celebrations in Cardiff and Scotland.
F – Emeli performed at London's Lovebox Festival 2012 in Victoria Park.
G – Emeli performed at BBC 1's Big Weekend in Hackney Marshes, London.
H – Emeli performed at Lounge On The Farm in Kent, England.
I – Emeli performed at T in the Park 2012 in Kinross, Scotland.
J – Emeli performed at Luglio Suona Bene Festival 2012 in Rome, Italy.
K – Emeli performed at Arena Derthona Music Festival 2012 in Tortona, Italy.
L – Emeli performed at Montreux Jazz Festival in Montreux, Switzerland.
M – Emeli supported Coldplay on their Mylo Xyloto Tour in Toronto, Canada.
N – Emeli performed at 2012 Summer Olympics opening ceremony in Olympic Stadium, London, England.
O – Emeli supported Coldplay on their Mylo Xyloto Tour in on their North America Leg in July/August 2012.
P – Emeli performed at 2012 Summer Olympics closing ceremony in Olympic Stadium, London, England.
Q – Emeli performed at Belsonic Festival 2012, in Belfast, Northern Ireland.
R – Emeli performed at V Festival 2012 in Hylands Park and Weston Park, England.
S – Emeli performed at iTunes Festival 2012 in Roundhouse, London.
T – Emeli performed at Bestival Festival 2012 in Isle of Wight, England.
U – Emeli performed at Maximus 2012 in Kotor, Montenegro.
V – Emeli's performance at Royal Albert Hall, London, England was filmed as a DVD and CD.
W – Emeli performed at Crisis Homeless Fundraising Christmas Concert with Paul Weller, Miles Kane and Ben Elton at Hammersmith Apollo, London, England.
X – Emeli performed at Chapstick's concert in West Hollywood, US'''
Y – Emeli performed at BBC Radio 2's Concert at BBC Radio Theatre, London, England.
Z – Emeli performed at Give it Up for Comic Relief at Wembley Arena, London, England.
AA – Emeli performed at a Priceless Acoustic-Set Gig in London, at St James's Theatre for MasterCard.
BB – Emeli performed at Channel 933 Summer Kickoff festival in Chula Vista, California, United States.
CC – Emeli performed at Isle of Wight Festival 2013.
DD – Emeli performed at T in the Park Festival 2013, in Kinross, Scotland.
EE – Emeli performed at Wireless Festival 2013, in London, England.
FF – Emeli performed at Lollapalooza Festival 2013 in Chicago, United States.
GG – Emeli performed at Outside Lands Music and Arts Festival in San Francisco, United States.
HH – Emeli performed at V Festival 2013, in Hylands Park and Weston Park, England.
II – Emeli performed at Made in America Festival 2013, Philadelphia, United States.
JJ – Emeli performed at The Tribute Concert to Stephen Lawrence at The O2 Arena in London on 29 September 2013
KK – Emeli performed at 40th Anniversary Concerts for Virgin Records at Koko in London, 4 November 2013.
LL – Emeli performed at New Year Eve celebrations in Dubai, 31 December 2013.

References 

2011 concert tours
2012 concert tours
2013 concert tours